Alfredo Esmatges (born 18 December 1932) is a Spanish former professional cyclist. Before turning professional, he had around 50 amateur victories.

Biography
Esmatges was born in Barcelona, Cantabri on December 18, 1932. In 1961 he took part in six-day track races on velodrome around the world. After retiring in 1962, he joined the technical commission of the Catalan Cycling Federation and was a technical advisor to the Association of Organizers of Races of Spain. Alfred was president of the Catalan Cycling Federation from 1978 to 1982.

Career
Esmatges debuted in the Spanish Track Championship as an independent. During his tenure he managed and issued federal licenses from Catalonia, and created the first cyclo-cross campaign and an intervelodrome tournament. Since 1983 he has been running the Unión Ciclista Igualadina. He was also the director of the Catalan Cycling School (1984-86) and held positions within the organization of the Vuelta a España and the Volta a Catalunya. He received the gold medal of the Royal Spanish Cycling Federation.

Major results

1955
 1st Stage 1 Volta a Catalunya
1956
 1st Stage 7 Vuelta a Levante
 7th Trofeo Masferrer
1959
 1st Lleida
1960
 1st Stage 6 Vuelta a Levante

References

External links
 

1932 births
Living people
Cyclists from Barcelona
Spanish male cyclists